The 2021–22 Sydney FC season is the club's 17th season since its establishment in 2004. The club is participating in the A-League for the 17th time and the FFA Cup for the seventh time. Also, as the runners-up of the 2020–21 A-League they qualified for the 2022 AFC Champions League qualifying play-offs phase.

Players

Transfers

Transfers in

From youth squad

Transfers out

Contract extensions

Pre-season and friendlies

Competitions

A-League

League table

Matches

Notes

FFA Cup

AFC Champions League

Qualifying play-offs

Group stage

Statistics

Squad statistics 
{| class="wikitable sortable"
! rowspan="2" |No.
! rowspan="2" |Pos
! rowspan="2" |Nat
! rowspan="2" |Player
! colspan="2" |Total
! colspan="2" |A-League 
! colspan="2" |FFA Cup
! colspan="2" |Champions League
|-
!Apps
!Goals
!Apps
!Goals
!Apps
!Goals
!Apps
!Goals
|-
|1
|GK
|
|Andrew Redmayne
|26
|0
|16
|0
|4
|0
|6
|0
|-
|2
|DF
|
|James Donachie
|24
|1
|17
|0
|2
|1
|5
|0
|-
|3
|DF
|
|Ben Warland
|22
|0
|15
|0
|1
|0
|6
|0
|-
|4
|DF
|
|Alex Wilkinson
|34
|0
|26
|0
|4
|0
|4
|0
|-
|5
|DF
|
|Connor O'Toole
|17
|0
|13
|0
|0
|0
|4
|0
|-
|6
|MF
|
|Mustafa Amini
|24
|1
|17
|1
|0
|0
|7
|0
|-
|7
|DF
|
|Michael Zullo
|0
|0
|0
|0
|0
|0
|0
|0
|-
|8
|MF
|
|Paulo Retre
|34
|0
|23
|0
|4
|0
|7
|0
|-
|9
|FW
|
|Bobô 
|26
|7
|20
|5
|2
|0
|4
|2
|-
|10
|MF
|
|Miloš Ninković
|28
|3
|22
|3
|3
|0
|3
|0
|-
|11
|FW
|
|Kosta Barbarouses
|15
|1
|11
|1
|1
|0
|3
|0
|-
|12
|FW
|
|Trent Buhagiar
|31
|8
|23
|5
|2
|1
|6
|2
|-
|14
|FW
|
|Adam Le Fondre
|30
|11
|21
|7
|2
|1
|6
|3
|-
|16
|FW
|
|Luciano Narsingh
|14
|1
|10
|1
|0
|0
|4
|0
|-
|17
|MF
|
|Anthony Caceres
|34
|5
|24
|5
|3
|0
|6
|0
|-
|19
|MF
|
|Chris Zuvela
|0
|0
|0
|0
|0
|0
|0
|0
|-
|20
|GK
|
|Tom Heward-Belle
|10
|0
|9
|0
|0
|0
|1
|0
|-
|21
|DF
|
|Harry Van Der Saag
|19
|1
|11
|0
|4
|1
|4
|0
|-
|22
|MF
|
|Max Burgess
|33
|2
|24
|2
|3
|0
|6
|0
|-
|23
|DF
|
|Rhyan Grant
|29
|1
|21
|1
|3
|0
|5
|0
|-
|24
|MF
|
|Corey Hollman
|1
|0
|1
|0
|0
|0
|0
|0
|-
|25
|DF
|
|Callum Talbot
|24
|0
|17
|0
|2
|0
|5
|0
|-
|26
|MF
|
|Luke Brattan
|1
|0
|0
|0
|1
|0
|0
|0
|-
|27
|FW
|
|Elvis Kamsoba
|24
|5
|17
|3
|3
|2
|4
|0
|-
|28
|MF
|
|Calem Nieuwenhof
|4
|0
|2
|0
|2
|0
|0
|0
|-
|29
|DF
|
|Anton Mlinaric
|0
|0
|0
|0
|0
|0
|0
|0
|-
|30
|GK
|
|Adam Pavlesic
|1
|0
|1
|0
|0
|0
|0
|0
|-
|31
|MF
|
|Adrian Segecic
|6
|0
|4
|0
|0
|0
|2
|0
|-
|32
|MF
|
|Patrick Yazbek
|25
|1
|14
|1
|4
|0
|7
|0
|-
|33
|FW
|
|Patrick Wood
|17
|3
|9
|1
|4
|1
|4
|1
|-
|35
|DF
|
|Liam McGing
|3
|0
|1
|0
|1
|0
|1
|0
|-
|
|DF
|
|Joel King†
|12
|0
|8
|0
|4
|0
|0
|0
|-

† Player left Sydney during the season

Goals 

 As of 12 May 2022

Clean sheets 

 As of 12 May 2022

End of Season awards 
On 10 June 2022, Sydney FC hosted their annual Sky Blue Ball and presented nine awards on the night.

See also 
 2021–22 Sydney FC (A-League Women) season

References

Sydney FC seasons
2021–22 A-League Men season by team